The 1981–82 2. Bundesliga season was the eighth season of the 2. Bundesliga, the second tier of the German football league system.  It was the first season with the 2. Bundesliga consisting of a single league, after the abolition of the Nord and Süd divisions.

FC Schalke 04 and Hertha BSC were promoted to the Bundesliga while TSV 1860 Munich, VfR Wormatia Worms, Freiburger FC and SpVgg Bayreuth were relegated to the Oberliga.

Teams
For the 1981–82 season, the league abolished the Nord and Süd divisions to form a single-division league featuring 20 teams. The three teams relegated from the 1980–81 Bundesliga, Bayer Uerdingen, 1860 Munich and Schalke 04, entered the league. Due to the format change, there was no promotion for teams from the Oberliga to the 2. Bundesliga. Werder Bremen, the Nord champions, and Darmstadt 98, the Süd champions, were promoted to the Bundesliga, along with play-off winners Eintracht Braunschweig.

The remaining participants of the league, as well as which teams would be relegated from the previous season, were determined by a sophisticated placement system. The top four teams from each division automatically qualified for the league (unless promoted), while teams in 17th and below were automatically relegated. The remaining teams from 5th to 16th place in the Nord and Süd divisions were ranked on various criteria, with the worst placed teams being relegated to the Oberliga.

Team changes

League table

Results

Top scorers 
The league's top scorers:

References

External links
 2. Bundesliga 1981/1982 at Weltfussball.de 
 1981–82 2. Bundesliga at kicker.de 

1981-82
2
Ger